Niphonympha is a genus of moths of the family Yponomeutidae.

Species
Niphonympha argentea - Busck, 1912 
Niphonympha dealbatella - Zeller, 1847 
Niphonympha delias  (Meyrick, 1913) (from India/Assam)
Niphonympha devota  (Meyrick, 1913)  (from India/Assam)
Niphonympha duplicata  (Meyrick, 1913) (from Sri Lanka)
Niphonympha oxydelta - (Meyrick, 1913) (from India/Coorg)
Niphonympha vera - Moriuti, 1963

References

Meyrick, 1913. Exotic Microlepidoptera Vol.1: 147-149

Yponomeutidae